John Bosco Ikojo (born 21 July 1974) is a Ugandan accountant, Finance expert and politician. He is the elected Member of Parliament for Bukedea County, Bukedea District, and a representative for NRM, the ruling political party in Uganda. He is a member the NRM Parliamentary Caucus and serves as a member on the Committee on National Economy and the Committee on Natural Resources in the 10th Parliament of Uganda.

Prior to his political career, Ikojo worked as the head of finance for Bukedea Town Council and as an accountant for Kumi District Local Government. He is also the founder and managing director of ROSKO Uganda, a limited liability company in Uganda.

Early life and education
Ikojo was born in Bukedea, Teso sub-region, on 21 July 1974 in an Anglican family of the Itesot. He had his primary education in his home town of Bukedea and attained his PLE certification in 1988.

He then attended Wiggins Secondary School for his O-Level education and Ngora High School for his A-Level education, attaining a UCE certification in 1992 and a UACE certification in 1996.

Ikojo further advanced to Makerere University Business School at Uganda College of Commerce Aduku where he attained a higher diploma in marketing in 1998. He then went to Makerere University, graduating in 2006 with a Bachelor of Commerce. He additionally attained a Master of Business Administration from Uganda Management Institute in 2014.

Career and politics
Ikojo started his professional career in 2000 after acquiring a higher diploma in marketing and worked as an accountant for Kumi District Local Government up until 2007 when he secured employment as the head of finance at Bukedea Town Council. He served the small municipality up until 2010 when he resigned to join elective politics.

In 2010, Ikojo joined elective politics on the National Resistance Movement ticket and strategized for the 2016 polls a move that saw him win both the party's 2015 primary elections and the 2016 general elections thereby becoming a member of the 10th Parliament for the Pearl of Africa representing Bukedea County in Bukedea District. In the 10th Parliament, Ikojo serves on the Committee on National Economy and the Committee on Natural Resources. He is also a member of the NRM Parliamentary Caucus.

Private details
Ikojo is a married man with a number of children. He is also the managing director of ROSKO Uganda, a limited liability company that he founded in 2004.

See also 
Bukedea District
National Resistance Movement
Parliament of Uganda

References

External links 
 Website of the Parliament of Uganda

Living people
1974 births
Members of the Parliament of Uganda
People from Eastern Region, Uganda
Itesot people
Active politicians
Makerere University alumni
Makerere University Business School alumni
Uganda Management Institute alumni
National Resistance Movement politicians
21st-century Ugandan politicians